Hans van Kesteren (21 February 1908 – 21 July 1998) was a Dutch footballer. He played in one match for the Netherlands national football team in 1929.

References

External links
 

1908 births
1998 deaths
Dutch footballers
Netherlands international footballers
Place of birth missing
Association footballers not categorized by position